Sting of the Zygons is a BBC Books original novel written by Stephen Cole and based on the long-running science fiction television series Doctor Who. It features the Tenth Doctor and Martha Jones. It was published on 19 April 2007, after the television debut of companion Martha Jones, alongside Wooden Heart and The Last Dodo.

The Zygons, who have previously appeared both on television (Terror of the Zygons) and print (The Bodysnatchers), make a return appearance. David Tennant has stated in an interview that the Zygons were his favourite monsters in the classic series.

Plot summary
The TARDIS lands the Doctor and Martha in the Lake District in 1909, where a small village has been terrorised by a giant, scaly monster. The search is on for the elusive 'Beast of Westmorland', and explorers, naturalists and hunters from across the country are descending on the fells. King Edward VII himself is on his way to join the search, with a knighthood for whoever finds the Beast.

But there is a more sinister presence at work in the Lakes than a monster on the rampage, and the Doctor is soon embroiled in the plans of an old and terrifying enemy - the Zygons. As the hunters become the hunted, a desperate battle of wits begin - with the future of the entire world at stake.

Audiobook
An abridged audiobook was released in July 2007. It is read by Reggie Yates (Leo Jones in the TV series).

See also

Whoniverse

External links

 The Cloister Library - Sting of the Zygons

Fiction set in 1909
2007 British novels
2007 science fiction novels
New Series Adventures
Tenth Doctor novels
Novels by Stephen Cole
Novels set in the Lake District